Opharus gemma is a moth of the family Erebidae. It was described by William Schaus in 1894. It is found in French Guiana, Bolivia, Venezuela and the Brazilian state of Rio Grande do Sul.

References

Opharus
Moths described in 1894
Arctiinae of South America